Pierre Chaillet (1900–1972) was a French Catholic priest of the Society of Jesus (Jesuits), who was recognised as Righteous among the Nations by Yad Vashem for his work to protect Jews from the Nazi Holocaust.

The Amitiés Chrétiennes organisation operated out of Lyon to secure hiding places for Jewish children. Among its members was the Jesuit Pierre Chaillet. The influential French theologian Henri de Lubac SJ was active in the resistance to Nazism and to antisemitism. He assisted in the publication of Témoinage chrétien with Pierre Chaillet, responding to Neo-paganism and antisemitism with clarity, describing the notion of an Aryan New Testament standing in contradiction to a Semitic Old Testament as "blasphemy" and "stupidity".

See also

Jesuits and Nazism

References 

1900 births
1972 deaths
People from Doubs
20th-century French Jesuits
Catholic resistance to Nazi Germany
Recipients of the Resistance Medal
French Resistance members
Recipients of the Croix de Guerre 1939–1945 (France)
Catholicism and Judaism
Nazi Germany and Catholicism
French Righteous Among the Nations
Catholic Righteous Among the Nations
Chevaliers of the Légion d'honneur
Date of birth missing
Date of death missing